Emanuele Santi is an Italian development economist and political scientist and book author. His books include Fear no more: Voices of the Tunisian Revolution  a best selling and passionate coverage of the Tunisian Revolution

He is the President and co-founder of Afrilanthropy a charity offering advise social enterprises as well as philanthropic organizations and impact investors. 

He was the fund manager of the Agri-Business Capital Fund, a fund spearheaded by IFAD and a number of organizations focused on supporting agri-business in developing countries. Prior to that, he worked for nearly two decades for multilateral development banks and (World Bank, African Development Bank) and IFAD advising governments on numerous public sector and governance reforms. His work experience spans over 15 developing countries mostly in Africa, Eastern Europe and Latin America. He authors various books and articles on development issues, particularly in the area of governance, regional integration and local development. These include Fear no more: Voices of the Tunisian Revolution a passionate coverage of the Tunisian Revolution which he experienced firsthand as a local resident, blogger and economist

In 2012, Emanuele Santi founded Souk Attanmia , the largest and most innovative partnership in support to social entrepreneurship in Tunisia.Stanford SS Review case study

In 2022 he launched Riding the Rainbow, a global app promoting circular economy and social integration of refugees

Publications 
Russo, F, Santi, E, Fear No More, Amazon, 2021, https://www.amazon.it/dp/B09NRD21FR

Santi, E, Decentralization and Governance in Developing Countries: The case of Ghana Edit Lambert|May 22, 2012

Santi, E et al. (Eds), Unlocking North Africa’s Potential through Regional Integration, African Development Bank Tunis, Tunisia, 2012 Edit African Development Bank|April 1, 2012. 

Santi, E. et al., New Libya, New Neighbourhood: What Opportunities for Tunisia? North Africa Quarterly Analytical, N.1, African Development Bank, Tunis, Tunisia, 2012 Edit African development bank|January 15, 2012 

Santi E., La Rivoluzione Tunisina, Origini e Prospettive, Rivista di Studi Politici - S. Pio V, 2/2011 - Anno XXIII - Aprile/Giugno Edit Universita di San Pio V|April 1, 2011

Santi, E, Ben Romdhane, S., Assessing the preliminary impacts of the Libya's crisis on the Tunisian economy Edit Topics in Middle Eastern and African Economies|September 1, 2011

Negatu G, Santi E, Tench E “Improving governance and Public Financial Management through budget support: The experience of the African, Development Bank” ECDPM Discussion Paper 88B, Maastricht, 2010 

Santi, E, Santiso, C and Campos, I, “Assessing Governance, Staff Guidance Note on the Governance Rating of the Bank’s Country Performance Assessment”, African Development Bank, 2009 Edit African Development Bank|June 15, 2009

Santi, E. Grenna, L. : “Environmental Communications Assessment: A framework of analysis for the environmental governance”, in Walker, G. and Kinsella, W. (2005) Finding our Way(s) in Environmental Communication Edit 2003
Authors: Emanuele Santi, Lucia Grenna

Koutsouris, A., Santi E. and Tare A., "Building support for protected area: the case of the Butrint National Park", in Auchincloss, E. and Goldstein, W. (Eds.) Communicating Protected Areas. IUCN, Gland, Switzerland, 2004 Edit IUCN|2004

Russo F., Santi E.: “La Banca Mondiale”. In Caviglia E (Ed) Le Istituzioni Finanziarie nel Nuovo Contesto Internazionale,Milano, 2003 Edit Led Editore|2003

Russo F., Santi E.: South-east Asian Trade Off: Between Economic Development and Nuclear Armament: Which Way for a New International Role? Paper commissioned by the Military Centre of Strategic Studies (CEMISS), Rome, 2003 Edit Italian Ministry of Defence|2003
Authors: Emanuele Santi, Francesca Russo

Santi, E.: “La Crisi Asiatica e gli Effetti sull’Economia Italiana”, Politeia, Vol. 64, Milano, 2001 Edit Politeia|2001
Authors: Emanuele Santi

Santi, E.: “In Search of a Quantitative Approach for Political Criteria of EU Enlargement", Europa 2002, Vol. 3 33, Budapest, 2001 Edit Europa 2002|2001

Living people
Italian economists
Year of birth missing (living people)